Garra fasciacauda is a species of ray-finned fish in the genus Garra from the Chao Praya, Mae Klong and Mekong rivers in south-east Asia.

References 

Garra
Fish of Thailand
Fish described in 1937